ADP ribosylation factor like GTPase 6 interacting protein 6 is a protein that in the humans is encoded by the ARL6IP6 gene. It spans from 152,717,893 to 152,761,253 on the plus strand.

Gene

General properties 

ARL6IP6 Also known as Phosphonoformate Immuno-Associated Protein 1. It has 43,361 bases and 11 exons and is located on the long arm of chromosome 2 , at 2q23.3 in humans. In humans there are three
upstream genes (PRPF40A, FMNL2 and STAM2) and three downstream genes (GALNT13, KCNJ3, NR4A2) that define the identity of this genomic region.

Promoter

Expression

References 

Human proteins